The Christchurch Symphony Orchestra (CSO) is the largest professional orchestra in the South Island of New Zealand, based in the city of Christchurch. It was established in 1958 as the John Ritchie String Orchestra, due to the vision and encouragement of Christchurch composer John Ritchie. It was renamed the Christchurch Civic Orchestra four years later in 1962, and has used its current name since 1974.

Currently, the CSO has an established core of principal and tenured players with additional contracted casual players. The orchestra performs in over fifty concerts a year including performances for the Royal New Zealand Ballet, Southern Opera, Christchurch City Council events, the National Concerto Competition and the Adam International Cello Festival and Competition. The CSO repertoire presents a wide range of classical, pops and contemporary musical styles. The orchestra also works with primary and secondary schools throughout the South Island with its Community Engagement Programme.
The Chief Conductor since 2015 is the Australian conductor Benjamin Northey.

Bic Runga has recorded an album with the CSO, Live in Concert with the Christchurch Symphony.

The orchestra has collaborated with a range of artists, including the Adults in 2012, Anika Moa and Julia Deans in 2015, and Tiki Taane, Big Sima, and Tali in 2021.

References

External links
 
 

Musical groups established in 1958
Organisations based in Christchurch
Culture in Christchurch
New Zealand orchestras
Symphony orchestras
Musical groups from Christchurch
1958 establishments in New Zealand